Benjamin M. Dever (died April 20, 1942) was an American politician from Maryland. He served as a member of the Maryland House of Delegates, representing Harford County, from 1924 to 1926.

Early life
Benjamin M. Dever was born to George Dever.

Career
Dever was a Democrat. He served as a member of the Maryland House of Delegates, representing Harford County, from 1924 to 1926.

Personal life
Dever married Susan "Susie" E. Carty, granddaughter of George W. Baker and niece of William Benjamin Baker, on December 22, 1897. His daughter was Mrs. Joseph Ball.

Dever died on April 20, 1942, at the age of 72. He was buried at Baker's Cemetery in Aberdeen, Maryland.

References

Year of birth missing
Place of birth missing
People from Harford County, Maryland
Democratic Party members of the Maryland House of Delegates